Kings Row is an hour-long American television period drama starring Jack Kelly, Nan Leslie and Robert Horton which was broadcast on ABC between September 13, 1955 and January 17, 1956 as part of the wheel series Warner Bros. Presents. It was the first of 20 filmed shows produced for ABC between 1955 and 1963 by Warner Bros Television, under the supervision of executive producer William T. Orr, Kings Row is also the only straight drama among those shows, whereas Westerns and detective/adventure series comprised 14 of the 20 productions.

The series' protagonist is psychiatrist Parris Mitchell, who has recently set up his practice in a small town of the Midwestern United States. He is met with mistrust and prejudice.

Series elements
Based on the 1940 novel by Henry Bellamann and its film version, Kings Row, which was nominated for three Oscars, including Best Picture, at the 15th Academy Awards in March 1943, the TV version starred Jack Kelly, Nan Leslie and Robert Horton, portraying the characters played in the film by Robert Cummings, Ann Sheridan and Ronald Reagan, respectively. It turned out to be the least successful among Orr's twenty ABC series, having been canceled after the production of only seven episodes.

Although the standard length for episodes of hour-long filmed series had subsequently become established at 53 or 54 minutes, the first 23 episodes of Warner Bros. Presents, including all 7 installments of Kings Row, were timed to run 48 minutes, thus enabling Warner Bros Television to run 6-minute segments, hosted by Gig Young, promoting upcoming Warners films and chatting with stars under contract to the studio.

Background for the creation of the series
German-American novelist Henry Bellamann (birth name Heinrich Hauer Bellamann), whose heritage made him a social outcast in the small Missouri city of Fulton where he was born and raised, channeled the bitter memories of his youth into the bestselling novel, Kings Row, copyrighted in 1940 and published in 1941 by Simon and Schuster. The rights to the novel, which chronicles moral decay in a fictional midwestern town at the end of the 19th and the beginning of the 20th century, were immediately purchased by Warner Bros., which put the film version into production between August and October 1941, with the New York City premiere receiving publicity on February 2, 1942. In addition to the Oscar nomination for Best Picture, the film also earned a Best Director nomination for Sam Wood and Best Cinematographer, Black-and-White nomination for James Wong Howe.

More than a decade later, Warner Bros Television chose its Best Picture nominees for 1942, Kings Row (the studio had one other nominee, Yankee Doodle Dandy) and 1943, Casablanca (in addition to the winner, Warners had a second nominee, Watch on the Rhine), as television's initial two series to be directly derived from theatrical films. The third rotating element of Warner Bros. Presents, Cheyenne, the first of seven westerns produced for ABC, was a non-directly-derivative concept (Warners 1947 western, Cheyenne has no connection to the series) which also made history as TV's first hour-long western and also the first western series made for adults, rather than children, who had been watching such half-hour series as The Lone Ranger and The Cisco Kid since the earliest years of full-schedule TV programming. Analogous to the abbreviated time allotted for Kings Row, 8 of Casablanca's 10 installments and 8 of Cheyenne's 15 installments were also 48 minutes in length.

Social historian Otto Friedrich, in his 1986 book, City of Nets: A Portrait of Hollywood in the 1940s, describes the town which, at the beginning of the 1942 film, characterizes itself on a billboard in these words: "Kings Row 1890 — A Good Town — A Good Clean Town — A Good Town to Live In and a good place to Raise Your Children", as a "roiling inferno of fraud, corruption, treachery, hypocrisy, class warfare, and ill-suppressed sex of all varieties: adultery, sadism, homosexuality, incest."

Kings Row, the series
The elements which made the 1942 film difficult to be accepted by Hollywood's Production Code Authority were nowhere in evidence as the TV version went into production. The stories were molded into the style of standard TV drama of the period, omitting any mention of themes which would have been considered inappropriate for an early-evening audience. Actor Paul Stewart, assigned to direct the first episode, told columnist Bob Thomas that "the company will rehearse five days and shoot five days for the 48-minute dramas". "Everything is done in the authentic 1905 era", he remarked, "Some of the stuff is fabulous. I'd estimate we have $30,000 worth of furnishings here. Then we have an exterior set on the back lot of a Midwestern town".

Series characters
Parris Mitchell, portrayed by Jack Kelly, is the central personality who interacts with the conflicts in each episode's storylines, while Randy (Nan Leslie) and Drake (Robert Horton) are positioned as important supporting characters. Other characters from the book, including Dr. Henry Gordon, portrayed by Robert Burton, and Dr. Alexander Tower, portrayed by former second-tier film star Victor Jory, shorn of any unacceptably negative traits that their characters have in the novel and in the film, appear intermittently in the series. Tower becomes the central focus of the storyline in episode 5, "Introduction to Erica". Lillian Bronson, as Parris' grandmother, is retained as a semi-regular in the series.

Two years later, Jack Kelly would begin the role of Bart Maverick, brother to James Garner's Bret Maverick, in the television series Maverick for Warner Bros. and ABC, a part he continued for five seasons on the show. Also in 1957, Robert Horton would play the lead role of wagon train scout "Flint McCullough" in the television series Wagon Train starring Ward Bond and, after Bond's abrupt death, John McIntire. Both Kelly and Horton began their respective new series in 1957, concurrently playing their parts for five seasons before departing from the roles for which they were both most closely identified for the rest of their careers.

Episodes

Sources
Anderson, Christopher. Hollywood TV: The Studio System in the Fifties. Austin: University of Texas Press, 1994.
Balio, Tino, editor. Hollywood in the Age of Television. Boston: Unwin, Hyman, 1990.
Woolley, Lynn; Malsbary, Robert W. and Strange, Robert G., Jr. Warner Brothers Television: Every Show of the Fifties and Sixties, Episode by Episode. Jefferson, North Carolina: McFarland, 1985.

References

External links 

Kings Row at TVGuide
Kings Row episode list at WebCitation
Kings Row episode list at SquareOne

1955 American television series debuts
1956 American television series endings
Television series by Warner Bros. Television Studios
American Broadcasting Company original programming
1950s American drama television series
Black-and-white American television shows
English-language television shows
1950s American medical television series
Live action television shows based on films
Television shows based on American novels
Television series based on adaptations
Psychiatry in fiction
Television shows set in the Midwestern United States